The Rangpur Division cricket team is a Bangladeshi first-class team representing the Rangpur Division, the northernmost of the seven administrative regions in Bangladesh. The team competes in the National Cricket League (NCL). Their home venue is the Rangpur Cricket Garden in Rangpur City. Rangpur are a recent addition to the NCL, having joined in 2011–12, and won their first title in 2014–15. The equivalent team in the Bangladesh Premier League (BPL) is the Rangpur Riders.

Honours
 National Cricket League (1) – 2014–15

History
Rangpur Division was formed on 25 January 2010, as Bangladesh's seventh administrative division. Before that, the territory had been the northern eight districts of the Rajshahi Division and the new Rangpur division consists of the same eight districts. As the National Cricket League has always been based on the administrative divisions, it was decided to invite a Rangpur team and so increase the competition's membership from the existing six. In order to keep the membership an even number, the NCL also invited Dhaka Metropolis to join. The two new teams made their NCL debuts in the 2011–12 season. In the 2014–15 season, Rangpur won their first NCL championship in a last-ball finish on the final day of the competition.

At the end of the 2017-18 competition Rangpur Division had played, in seven seasons, a total of 46 first-class matches with 13 wins, 10 defeats and 23 draws.

Results in National Cricket League
 2011–12: two wins in seven matches, finished sixth
 2012–13: one win in seven matches, finished seventh
 2013–14: three wins in seven matches, finished third
 2014–15: four wins in seven matches, champions
 2015–16: no wins in six matches, finished fourth (last) in Tier 1
 2016–17: two wins in six matches, finished first in Tier 2
 2017–18: no wins in six matches (all matches drawn), finished second in Tier 1

Players
Rangpur Division has had four Test players: Nasir Hossain, Naeem Islam senior, Sajidul Islam and Suhrawadi Shuvo. Team captains have been Tariq Ahmed (2011–12), Suhrawadi Shuvo (2012–13 and 2013–14), Sajidul Islam (2014–15) and Dhiman Ghosh (2015–16).

The two highest scores for Rangpur Division were made in the same innings: Dhiman Ghosh made 183 and Alauddin Babu 180, and they shared a fifth-wicket partnership of 322, which is also Rangpur Division's highest partnership for any wicket, in the match against Chittagong Division in 2011–12. The best bowling figures are 7 for 64 by Sanjit Saha, at the age of 17, against Khulna Division in 2015–16.

The list below is of all the players who have represented Rangpur Division from the 2011–12 season to the present.

 Abdur Rahman (2011–12 to 2012–13)
 Afsharul Sujon (2011–12)
 Ahamedul Kabir (2013–14)
 Ahsanul Lipu (2011–12 to 2012–13)
 Alauddin Babu (2011–12 to 2013–14)
 Arafat Sunny (2015–16)
 Arif Reza (2011–12)
 Ariful Haque (2011–12 to 2015–16)
 Ashraful Alam (2013–14)
 Avishek Mitra (2012–13)
 Bishawnath Halder (2014–15 to 2015–16)
 Dhiman Ghosh (2011–12 to 2015–16)
 Jahid Javed (2013–14)
 Kalyan Ashish (2013–14 to 2015–16)
 Liton Das (2011–12 to 2015–16)
 Mahmudul Hasan (2011–12 to 2015–16)
 Minhas Reza (2011–12)
 S. M. Mustakim (2011–12)
 Naeem Islam junior (2011–12)
 Naeem Islam senior (2011–12 to 2015–16)
 Nahidul Islam (2015–16)
 Nasir Hossain (2012–13 to 2015–16)
 Nobin Islam (2015–16)
 Robiul Islam Robi (2011–12 to 2012–13)
 Saddam Hossain (2015–16)
 Saddam Hossain Shawon (2013–14 to 2015–16)
 Sajidul Islam (2011–12 to 2015–16)
 Salauddin (2012–13 to 2013–14)
 Sanjit Saha (2014–15 to 2015–16)
 Saymon Ahmed (2011–12 to 2015–16)
 Subashis Roy (2011–12 to 2015–16)
 Suhrawadi Shuvo (2012–13 to 2015–16)
 Tanveer Haider (2011–12 to 2015–16)
 Tariq Ahmed (2011–12 to 2015–16)

Current squad
, The current squad for 2019–20 season

References

External links
 Lists of matches played by Rangpur Division
 CricketArchive re Bangladesh
 CricInfo re Bangladesh

Bangladeshi first-class cricket teams
Rangpur Division
Bangladesh National Cricket League
Cricket clubs established in 2011
2011 establishments in Bangladesh